The Statistics and Census Service (DSEC) is the statistics agency of Macau. Its head office is on the 17th floor of Dynasty Plaza (皇朝廣場) in Sé (Cathedral Parish).

References

External links
 Statistics and Census Service
 Statistics and Census Service 
 Statistics and Census Service  (Traditional)
 Statistics and Census Service  (Simplified)

Government of Macau
Macau